Dmitri Petrovich Savitski (January 25, 1944 – April 11, 2019)   was a Soviet-born Russian-French writer and poet.

List of works

Novels 

His only work translated In English was the novel Waltz for K. (cinematized in 2008 by Roman Balayan). Published in Evergreen magazine, Grove-Press, N-Y. 1986. No. 98. Translated by Kingsley Shorter. Broadcast in BBC in 1986. 
 
His first two books Savitski created in Russian, but it was never published in original, because, as the author explains, it was addressed to Western audience. This two novels were edited under pen names – Alexandre Dimov and Dimitri Savitski-Dimov:

 Les hommes doubles. — Paris: J.C.Lattès, 1979. Translated by Florence Benoit. Extracts were published in Paris Match magazine (1980).
 L'anti guide de Moscou. – Paris: Ramsay, 1980. — . Translated by Jacqueline Lahana. 2nd ed. — Paris: Ramsay, 1988.

Next books are published both in Russian and French:

 Waltz for K. (Вальс для К.)
 In French: Valse pour K. Paris: J.C.Lattès, 1985. Translated by Geneviève Leibrich. Adapted to broadcast play at France Culture in 1987.
 In English: Waltz for K. in Evergreen magazine, Grove-Press, N-Y. 1986. No. 98. Translated by Kingsley Shorter. Broadcast in BBC in 1986.
 In Russian in the collection 'Six stories' (Шесть рассказов) (Paris, 1987) and 'From Nowhere with Love' (Ниоткуда с любовью) (Moscow., 1990, Saint-Petersburg., 1995), look beneath.
 From Nowhere with Love (Ниоткуда с любовью).
 In Russian: in N-Y: Third Wave ed.,  1987. Also in a collection of novels and stories Ниоткуда с любовью. Moscow, Raduga ed., 1990. 
 In French: Bons baisers de nulle part. Paris: Albin-Michel. 1980. Translated by  Geneviève Leibrich.
 In Italian: Mille baci da nessun' luogo. Milan: Grazanti. 1988. Translated by  Emanuela Guercetti.

 Theme without variations: Passé décomposé, futur simple (Тема без вариаций: Passé décomposé, futur simple).
 In Russian: Saint-Petersburg: Khimera ed., 1998.
 In French: Passé décomposé, futur simple. Paris: Du Rocher, 2002.

Short stories

 In Russian:
 in a collection Six Stories (Шесть рассказов). Paris: Syntax ed. 1987. (Contense: Waltz for K., Peter the Terrible, Music in pills, West site of Cocytus, Lora,  Baudler, p. 31)
 in a collection of novels and short stories From Nowhere with Love (Ниоткуда с любовью). Contence: the same stories as above plus Low Summer Stars (Низкие звезды лета).
 In Czech: Laura, Petr Hrozný, Západní břeh Styxu, Ludwig van u pilulkách in Revolver Revue, 15, 1991, březen. S. 177—221. Translated by Alena Bláhová.

References

1944 births
2019 deaths
Russian male poets
Russian radio personalities
Soviet dissidents
Naturalized citizens of France
Writers from Moscow
Russian emigrants to France
French people of Russian descent